Vittoria Aleotti (c. 1575 – after 1620), believed to be the same as Raffaella Aleotta (c. 1570 – after 1646) was an Italian Augustinian nun, a composer and organist.

Early life
She was born in Ferrara to the prominent architect Giovanni Battista Aleotti, and was mentioned in his will, written in 1631. According to her father, Vittoria became interested in music after listening to her older sister being taught music. Within a year, Vittoria had mastered instruments, mainly the harpsichord, and voice so well that she was sent to train with Alessandro Milleville and Ercole Pasquini. At the age of 6 or 7, after working with Pasquini, it was suggested that Vittoria be sent to Ferrara’s San Vito, a convent famous for fostering musical talents. By the age of 14, Vittoria chose to enter the convent and dedicate her life to service.

Identity controversy
Giovanni Battista Aleotti is said to have had five daughters. Although there is no record of a daughter named Raffaella, it has been assumed that Vittoria changed her name once she dedicated herself to service. There are many accounts that suggest that Vittoria and Raffaella are two different sisters while others that assert that the two are the same woman.

This confusion of identity arises from Giovanni, who wrote the dedication for Vittoria, in her only published book of music. In it he suggests that while his oldest daughter was being prepared to become a nun and trained in music, his younger daughter, Vittoria, overheard and took a liking to music. With this knowledge, some suggest that Vittoria and Raffaella are two different women. To support this assertion, many have written that it was almost impossible and highly unlikely that the same woman would publish two books of different music under two different names. In addition, it is said that while Vittoria entrusted the dedication of her works to her father, Raffaella took full responsibility of writing her own dedication, thus insinuating the stark personality differences as well.

After 1593, Vittoria is never heard of again while Raffaella gained tremendous fame for her musical abilities to perform and to lead.

Works
In 1591, Vittoria published a single madrigal (Di pallide viole), in a musical anthology: Il giardino de musici ferraresi. Two years later, she set music to eight poems by Giovanni Battista Guarini, which her father later sent to Count del Zaffo, who had them printed in Venice by Giacomo Vincenti. This book of madrigals was entitled Ghirlanda de madrigali a quatro voci.  Aleotti was the first of at least 19 composers to set the text "T'amo mia vita" to music.

In the same year as Vittoria published her book of madrigals, Raffaella published a book of motets. Printed by Amadino in 1593, Sacrae cantiones quinque, septem, octo, & decem vocibus decantande, was the first book of sacred music by a woman to appear in print, and contains eighteen motets; thirteen quintets, two septets, two octets, and one motet for ten voices

Style
Raffaella was renowned for her skills at the organ and also well known in playing other instruments such as the harpsichord, the trombone, and other wind instruments. She was relentlessly praised by Ercole Bottrigari as having the talent and the skills to lead an ensemble of twenty-three nuns; she was also the Maestra at the convent until her death. Raffaella enjoyed complex music and would often use harmony and dissonance to heighten the text. However, she was at times criticized because some thought that as the music became more complex by utilizing more voices, the holiness of the music disappeared and gave way to pleasure.

Extant works
Motet: Angelus ad pastores ait (text of Luke 2:10-11)
Motet: Ego flos campi (a 7 vv), R. Aleotti
Il giardino de musici ferraresi (1591)
Sacrae cantiones quinque, septem, octo, & decem vocibus decantande (1593) Book of Motets for five, seven, eight, and ten voices.
Ghirlanda de madrigali a quatro voci (1593). Book of Madrigals for four voices
Renditions of her songs are available on many CDs including O Dulcis Amor.

References

 Pendle, Karin Swanson. Women and Music: a History. Bloomington: Indiana UP, 2001. Print.
 Bowers, Jane M., and Judith Tick. Women Making Music: the Western Art Tradition, 1150-1950. Urbana: University of Illinois, 1986. Print.
 Monson, Craig A. -- “Putting Bolognese Nun Musicians in Their Place” in Women’s Voices Across Musical Worlds, Jane Bernstein, ed, Northeastern University press, 2004 
 O dulcis amor: Women composers of the Seicento, La Villanella Basel (ensemble), Ramee (label), 2011. Web. accessed 09 Feb. 2011. <http://www.prestoclassical.co.uk/c/Aleotti>.

External links

modern performance notes on Aleotti
commercial CD recording of Alleotti's music

Italian women classical composers
Augustinian nuns
Italian classical organists
Italian Baroque composers
16th-century Italian Roman Catholic religious sisters and nuns
1570s births
17th-century deaths
Musicians from Ferrara
Renaissance composers
17th-century Italian composers
Women organists
17th-century women composers
17th-century keyboardists
17th-century Italian Roman Catholic religious sisters and nuns